The 1970 Texas Tech Red Raiders football team represented Texas Tech University in the Southwest Conference (SWC) during the 1970 NCAA University Division football season. In their first season under head coach Jim Carlen, the Red Raiders compiled an 8–4 record (5–2 against conference opponents), finished in third place in the SWC, lost to Georgia Tech in the 1970 Sun Bowl, and outscored all opponents by a combined total of 222 to 165. The team's statistical leaders included Charles Napper with 979 passing yards, Doug McCutchen with 1,068 rushing yards, and Johnny Odom with 331 receiving yards. The team played its home games at Clifford B. & Audrey Jones Stadium.

Schedule

References

Texas Tech
Texas Tech Red Raiders football seasons
Texas Tech Red Raiders football